Pacajes is a province in the Bolivian department of La Paz. Its capital is Coro Coro.

Geography 
Some of the highest mountains of the province are listed below:

The most important river of the province is the Desaguadero River. Other rivers in the province are  Ch'alla Jawira (in Aroma and Pacajes), Ch'alla Jawira (in Callapa), Jach'a Jawira (in Calacoto), Jach'a Jawira (in Caquiaviri), Llallawa Jawira, Qala Jawira, Qullpa Jawira and Thujsa Jawira.

Subdivision 
The province is divided into eight municipalities which are further subdivided into cantons.

References 

Provinces of La Paz Department (Bolivia)